The 2022 Supercupa Romăniei was the 24th edition of the Supercupa României, an annual football super cup contested by the winners of the previous season's Liga I and Cupa României competitions. It was the first Supercupa României edition to use the VAR system.

The game featured CFR Cluj and Sepsi OSK, and Stadionul Francisc von Neuman in Arad hosted the final for the first time on 9 July 2022. Sepsi OSK claimed its first trophy in their history.

Teams

Match

Details

References

2022–23 in Romanian football
Supercupa României
CFR Cluj matches
Sepsi OSK Sfântu Gheorghe